KTNN is a Navajo language AM (medium-wave) radio station broadcasting on 660 AM from Window Rock, Arizona, the seat of the government of the Navajo Nation.  It broadcasts Navajo tribal music and audio from Navajo ceremonial (powwow) dances and Native American music, as well as country music and bluegrass in English. It also broadcasts High School basketball games from the local high schools on the Navajo Reservation.  Most of its announcers are bilingual and broadcast in Navajo and English.

At the time the station came on the air in 1986, it claimed to be the last station allowed to go on the air with a full 50,000 watts on another station's clear channel frequency; however, other stations have been allowed since.

At night the station uses a directional antenna to protect, as required by FCC rules, the signal of WFAN at New York City, since WFAN is a Class A (formerly Class I-A) station broadcasting on 660 kHz and KTNN is Class B (formerly Class II-A).

See also
 List of radio stations in Arizona

References

External links
 KTNNOnline.com – Official Website

TNN
Country radio stations in the United States
Native American radio
Navajo mass media
Radio stations established in 1986
Foreign-language radio stations in the United States
1986 establishments in Arizona